CKPC (1380 kHz, Arise Christian Radio AM 1380) is a commercial AM radio station in Brantford, Ontario. Owned by Evanov Communications, it broadcasts a Christian format. Mornings, afternoons and late nights, the station plays Christian contemporary music. In middays and evenings, CKPC carries Christian talk and teaching shows. The radio studios are at 571 West Street in Brantford.

CKPC is powered at 25,000 watts.  To protect other stations on 1380 AM from interference, CKPC uses a directional antenna with a six-tower array.  The transmitter is on CKPC Road near Mount Pleasant Road in Brant, Ontario. Programming is also simulcast on FM via an HD Radio digital subchannel of sister station 92.1 CKPC-FM.

Programming
In morning drive time, CKPC airs the syndicated Intelligence for Your Life with John Tesh.  Tesh's comments and information are blended with Christian contemporary music.  In middays and evenings, CKPC carries programs from Jim Daly, John MacArthur, Chuck Swindoll, Nat Crawford and Charles Stanley.  

CKPC uses a time brokered system where local and North American religious leaders pay for 30 to 60 minute blocks on the station and may use their shows to seek donations to their ministries.

History
In December 1923, CKPC signed on the air. It was one of the earliest stations in Canada and the first to have a female owner in 1951. The original city of licence was Preston (now part of the city of Cambridge). The station first started out as an amateur radio station, but founder Wallace Russ quickly applied for a broadcast licence after a few trial transmissions. His licence was granted, and he started broadcasting from his home in Preston at a power of just 5 watts. 

After Russ sold the station to his friend Cyrus Dolph, he still remained active with the station, and watched it grow throughout its early years. Its power increased to 25 watts in 1927. It moved to 1010 kilocycles at 50 watts in 1930, and then to 880 kHz. The station's main content was local news and local artists and talents from Kitchener, Hamilton, and Brantford. 

In 1933, Cyrus Dolph purchased the station, which was soon moved from Preston to Brantford.  In 1934, the station moved to 930 kHz. In 1947, it moved to its current location on the band, 1380 AM. 

The company added an FM station in 1949, CKPC-FM, operating at 250 watts and simulcasting the AM signal. The AM and FM stations continued to mostly air the same programming until 1976, when the FM station's power increased to 50,000 watts. 

In 1951, Florence Buchanan assumed full control of Telephone City Broadcast Limited, including CKPC-FM and CKPC, from her father Cyrus. The AM station then had a 1,000-watt signal. She became the first woman in Canada to own and operate a radio station. In 1959, CKPC built a new transmitter and increased power to 10,000 watts. In 1972, Richard (R.D.) Buchanan purchased Telephone City Broadcast Ltd. from his mother Florence.

CKPC was an affiliate of the CBC Radio's Dominion Network until 1962 when the station became an independent outlet.

On March 15, 1999, Telephone City Broadcast Ltd. was denied a licence to add an FM translator at Simcoe to operate on 98.9 MHz with an effective radiated power of 1,090 watts. The proposed rebroadcasting transmitter was intended to correct coverage inadequacies in CKPC's AM signal to the Simcoe, Port Dover and Delhi area.

On June 1, 2004, CKPC switched formats from adult contemporary to oldies. Its power increased from 10,000 watts to 25,000 watts in 2007.

In 2009, after the death of then owner Richard Buchanan, the CRTC approved the sale of Telephone City Broadcast Limited from the Estate of R.D. Buchanan. The new owner was William Vasil Evanov of Evanov Communications, through the transfer of all issued and outstanding shares. Telephone City was the licensee of CKPC and CKPC-FM.

On June 24, 2010, the station flipped to a country format.

In February 2020, the CRTC approved a request by Evanov to move sister station CFWC-FM's Christian format to CKPC. Evanov felt that the country format would be more profitable on an FM signal. The switch took effect on-air on September 4, 2020, with Arise moving to 1380, and CFWC flipping to country as Hot Country 93.9.

References

External links
 
 
 

Radio stations established in 1923
Kpc
Kpc
1923 establishments in Ontario
KPC